The Boiling Spring Stakes is an American Thoroughbred horse race held annually during the last week of June at Monmouth Park Racetrack in Oceanport, New Jersey. A Grade III event open to three-year-old fillies, it is currently contested on turf over a distance of a mile and an eighth.

Inaugurated in 1977 at Meadowlands Racetrack, the race was moved to Monmouth Park in 2004.

The Boiling Springs Stakes was run in two divisions from 1977 through 1982 and in 1986, 1990, 1995, and 1997.

Records
Speed  record:
 1:39.81 – My Princess Jess (2008)

Most wins by an owner:
 4 – Darby Dan Farm (1981, 1990 (2), 1991)

Most wins by a jockey:
 4 – Jean-Luc Samyn (1978, 1982, 1993, 2000)
 6 – Joe Bravo (1992, 2004, 2007, 2008, 2012, 2015)

Most wins by a trainer:
 4 – John M. Veitch (1990 (2), 1991)

Winners

 † In 2007, Red Birkin finished first but was disqualified and set back to third for drifting out through the lane.

References
 Monmouth Park 2010 stakes race schedule and details for the Boiling Springs Stakes
 The 2009 Boiling Springs Stakes at ESPN

Graded stakes races in the United States
Horse races in New Jersey
Flat horse races for three-year-old fillies
Recurring sporting events established in 1977
Monmouth Park Racetrack
1977 establishments in New Jersey